Joseph Bernard Pearman (May 8, 1892 – May 30, 1961) was an American athlete who competed mainly in the 10 kilometre walk.

He competed for the United States in the 1920 Summer Olympics held in Antwerp, Belgium in the 10 kilometre walk where he won the silver medal.

He was born in Manhattan, New York.

References

1892 births
1961 deaths
Sportspeople from Manhattan
Track and field athletes from New York City
American male racewalkers
Olympic silver medalists for the United States in track and field
Athletes (track and field) at the 1920 Summer Olympics
Medalists at the 1920 Summer Olympics